Donald Goldfarb (born August 14, 1941 in New York City) is an American mathematician, best known for his works in mathematical optimization and numerical analysis.

Goldfarb studied Chemical Engineering at Cornell University, earning a BSChE in 1963. He obtained an M.S. from Princeton University in 1965, and a doctorate in 1966."Donakd Gokdfarb fsvulty homepage", Columbia University School of Engineering. Accessed February 16, 2022. 

After getting his Ph.D., Goldfarb spent two years as a post-doc at the Courant Institute in New York City. 

In 1968, he co-founded the CS Department at the City College of New York, serving 14 years on its faculty. During the 1979-80 academic year, he was a Visiting Professor in the CS and ORIE Departments at Cornell University. In 1982, Goldfarb joined the IEOR Department at Columbia, serving as Chair from 1984-2002. He also served as Interim Dean of Columbia's School of Engineering and Applied Science during the 1994-95 and 2012-13 academic years and its Executive Vice Dean during the Spring 2012 semester.

He is one of the developers of the Broyden–Fletcher–Goldfarb–Shanno algorithm. In 1992, he and J. J. Forrest developed the steepest edge simplex method.

Goldfarb is a SIAM Fellow. He was awarded the INFORMS John Von Neumann Theory Prize in 2017, the Khachiyan Prize in 2013, the INFORMS Prize for Research Excellence in the Interface between OR and CS in 1995, and was listed in The Worlds Most Influential Scientific Minds, 2014, as being among the 99 most cited mathematicians between 2002 and 2012. Goldfarb has served as an editor-in-chief of Mathematical Programming, an editor of the SIAM Journal on Numerical Analysis and the SIAM Journal on Optimization, and as an associate editor of Mathematics of Computation, Operations Research and Mathematical Programming Computation.

References 

1941 births
Living people
Cornell University College of Engineering alumni
20th-century American mathematicians
Princeton University alumni
Columbia University faculty
21st-century American mathematicians